Giacinto Campana (born c. 1600, Bologna) was an Italian painter of the Baroque period.

He trained first with Francesco Brizio, then with Francesco Albani. He moved to Poland to paint for King Władysław IV Vasa, and died in Poland.

Sources

Painters from Bologna
Italian Baroque painters
17th-century Italian painters
Italian male painters